The Symphony No. 4 in D minor is an orchestral symphony by the American composer Florence Price.  Composed in 1945, the work was never performed during Price's life and was presumed lost until it was discovered among a stash of manuscripts in her former summer home outside of St. Anne, Illinois, in 2009. These manuscripts, along with journals, books, and other documents that were discovered, are now preserved at the University of Arkansas. The symphony was given a belated world premiere by the Fort Smith Symphony under the direction of John Jeter in Fort Smith, Arkansas, on May 12, 2018.

Composition
The symphony has a duration of approximately 32 minutes in performance and is cast in four movements:
Tempo moderato
Andante cantabile
Allegro: Juba
Scherzo

The first movement contains a reference to the spiritual "Wade in the Water."

Instrumentation
The symphony is scored for a large orchestra consisting of piccolo, three flutes, two oboes, cor anglais, two clarinets, bass clarinet, two bassoons, four horns, three trumpets, two trombones, bass trombone, tuba, timpani, two percussionists, celesta, harp, and strings.

Reception
The symphony has been praised by modern music critics as a forgotten entry in American classical music.  Patrick Rucker of Gramophone wrote, "Her handling of the orchestra is idiomatic and strikingly original, with solos generously allocated throughout the ensemble." He added, "The introduction or, more appropriately, restoration of Price's unique voice is unquestionably an enrichment of the American symphonic canon."  Reviewing the symphony on album with Price's First Symphony, Phillip Scott of Limelight compared the music favorably to that of Price's contemporary William Grant Still and wrote, "While there is a deliberate Negro spiritual strain in her melodies, the most individual movements are the Scherzos. In both works they are a Juba: a syncopated stamping dance that was a precursor to ragtime. Price brilliantly captures its joyous enthusiasm, integrating it into European symphonic form. Elsewhere she taps into an Ivesian Americana (as in the First Symphony's hymn-like Largo). Price was the real thing, and these performances in excellent sound do her proud."

Recording
A recording of the world premiere performance by John Jeter and the Fort Smith Symphony was released on album with Price's Symphony No. 1 by Naxos Records in January 2019. This recording is part of an incomplete larger project to record all four of Price’s symphonies.

See also
Symphony No. 1 (Price)
Symphony No. 3 (Price)

References

4
1945 compositions
Compositions in D minor